Alligator olseni (common name Olsen's Alligator, named after Russel Olsen) is an extinct species of alligator. They lived in the Early Miocene period, around 20.4–15.97 million years ago and possibly earlier. Their range was principally in what is now known as Florida, United States, and possibly extending into southeastern Texas.

References

Alligatoridae
Miocene reptiles of North America
Fossil taxa described in 1942